Denain Voltaire Basket  is a French professional basketball club that was founded in 1947, and is based in Denain, France. The club plays in the LNB Pro B, which is the second-tier level pro competition in France.

History
The small club of the Voltaire school, moved up the French basketball hierarchy, until it reached the French basketball elite level in 1960, when it won the French Cup title. Five years later, the club won the top-level French League championship, with several players that had previously been Voltaire schoolchildren. In the late 1970s, the club gradually disappeared from the major French basketball landscape, before it began to once again climb up the French basketball ladder, and made it up to the French 2nd Division, for the 2011–12 season.

Honours

French League
 Winners (1): 1964–65

French Cup
 Winners (2): 1959–60, 1983–84 (amateur)

French Second League
 Winners (1): 1959–60, 1963–64

Pro B Leaders Cup
Winners (1): 2017–18

Season by season

Current roster

Notable players

 Hervé Dubuisson
 Isaia Cordinier
 Pierre Galle
 Yakuba Ouattara
 Kristófer Acox
 Elvar Már Friðriksson

External links
 Official Homepage of ASC Denain-Voltaire HP
 History of ASC Denain-Voltaire HP

Basketball teams in France
Basketball teams established in 1947
1947 establishments in France